Nazariy Volodymyrovych Vorobchak (born 22 March 2000) is a Ukrainian professional footballer who plays as a right midfielder for Ukrainian club Prykarpattia Ivano-Frankivsk.

References

External links
 Profile on Prykarpattia Ivano-Frankivsk official website
 

2000 births
Living people
People from Burshtyn
Ukrainian footballers
Association football midfielders
FC Oleksandriya players
FC Karpaty Halych players
FC Prykarpattia Ivano-Frankivsk (1998) players
Ukrainian First League players
Sportspeople from Ivano-Frankivsk Oblast